The Galmudug Security Force consists of the armed forces of the autonomous Galmudug region in central Somalia.

According to the Federal Member States' Operational Readiness Assessment carried out in Galmudug, Puntland, Jubaland and South West State of Somalia by AMISOM, Galmudug has the largest number of regional fighters with the heaviest weaponry including tanks and anti-tank (weapons).

History
On 14 August 2006, Galmudug declared autonomy in central Somalia thus establishing its own security force. On 23 December 2006, the newly formed security forces took part of the Battle of Bandiradley led by Colonel Abdi Qeybdiid alongside Ethiopian and Puntland forces. Galmudug was one of the principle opponents of the Islamic Courts Union till the ICU was dissolved on 27 December 2006.

In March 2016, Galmudug forces engaged in a intensive fighting against Al-Shabaab militia who fled from Puntland areas. The fighting which lasted 4 days resulted in Galmudug forces killing  115 militants and capturing 110 militants.

On 18 January 2018, Ahlu Sunna merged its forces and administration into Galmudug State's regional government and security forces.

A 2019 AMISOM Operational Readiness Assessment counted 5,754 'regional forces' in Galmudug.

Galmudug Darawish Force

Galmudug Darawish Force are military units that operate under the Galmudug state government. They are under the command of the Galmudug state President.

On  28 September 2016, US forces appeared to have been misled by intelligence provided by Puntland forces into carrying out an  airstrike in the vicinity of Galkayo that resulted in the deaths of 10 members of the Galmudug security forces.

Galmudug Police Force
The Galmudug Security Force operates its own Police Force.

Training with Europeans 
Galmudug security forces have been receiving multiple training courses from the European Union and NATO.

On 10 October 2017, Dutch and Swedish sailors on board HNLMS Rotterdam conducted medical training with local Galmudug Security Forces. The local interaction was in support of a mutual partnership to improve maritime skills.

On completion of the medical training, members of the Galmudug forces were presented with certificates during an upper deck ceremony.

On 11 October 2017, another unit of the Galmudug forces received medical and security training from the Spanish sailors on board EU Naval Force ship ESPS Rayo in order to strengthen maritime security in the region. The two teams then worked on engine maintenance drills.

In July 2013, Specialist Marine Services Ltd., a British owned Private Maritime Security Company were mentioned in the United Nations (UN) Security Council report by the United Nations Somalia, and Eritrea Monitoring Group (SEMG) for being in violation of the Arms Embargo for Somalia.

The report stated: “The provision of such training, assistance and equipment to “military forces” of the Galmudug State of Somalia by Specialist Marine Services and Steven Platt constitute a large-scale violation of the general and complete arms embargo on Somalia, established pursuant to Security Council resolutions 733 (1992) and 1425 (2002).”

The group CEO, Mr. Steven Platt, a former British soldier and security contractor had violated the UN arms embargo by providing military training services and equipment to forces in Galmudug.

“In “Galmudug” Somalia, a private company called Specialist Marine Services Ltd is providing training and military equipment to the “Galmudug” Armed Forces. The company has deployed a team of five expatriates in Galkayo to deliver “basic military training” and has distributed 600 sets of uniforms, communication equipment and body armour, in direct violation of the arms embargo on Somalia.”

SMS Ltd. spent 24 months in Galkacyo where they provided guidance and direction on Pirate Action Groups (PAGs) and main actors involved with piracy.

Furthermore, in addition to mapping the complex clan systems, SMS Ltd. reports highlighted key (prominent) clan militias and forces.

SMS Ltd. have been linked to have strong ties to Habargidir factions, particularly that of the Sa'ad. Mr. Platt, an associate of former Galmudug State President Abdi Hasan Awale “Qeybdiid” was arrested in December 2013 by the National Crime Agency (NCA) for "Conspiracy to Commit Piracy."" The charges were eventually dropped in December 2015.

National Intelligence and Security Agency
The National Intelligence and Security Agency is Somalia's national intelligence agency. It has a branch in Galmudug state where it provides intelligence services for the Galmudug security force and sometimes works alongside them.

References

Galmudug
Military of Somalia
Military in Africa
Law enforcement in Somalia
2006 establishments in Somalia
Organizations established in 2006